Kerim Kerimov (2 July 1971 – 5 May 1992) - National Hero of Azerbaijan was born in the Qarahəsənli village of the Sharur District of Nakhchivan Autonomous Republic of Azerbaijan.

Life
After he finished secondary school, he entered the school of Senior Military Engineering Commanders in Tyumen city of the Tyumen Oblast, Russia. He was an excellent student in the military and political trainings. After the Garabagh events started, the Azerbaijani students who were at the last course of Senior Military Engendering Commanders in Tyumen, decided to return to Azerbaijan and continue their education at the School of Senior Commanders. After having military training in Bileceri, they headed to Goranboy Rayon on 15 April.

In Battles
On 1 May 1992 the operation of neutralizing of the mined territory had started. He has neutralized more than 40 mines, buried by the enemy across the front line. During the operation, one of soldiers was injured. Kerim gave his blood when the soldier was needed blood group "A" which it was the same blood group with the injured soldier. On 5 May, has started the battle for the Talysh hills and they took control over the whole hill till 5 o’clock in the morning but the enemy started the counterattack from the Talysh village with very strong military equipment. Karimov was killed in this battle. After a few days, on 12 June, his body was found and taken from the battlefield and was sent to the Nakhchivan.

Family
He was single.

Awards
He was posthumously awarded the title of National Hero of Azerbaijan by the decree number 193 of the president of Azerbaijan Republic on 11 September 1992.

He was buried in the Qarahəsənli village of the Sharur District.
His bust was put Qarahəsənli village. There are schools and streets after his name in both Goranboy Rayon and Sharur Rayon.

References

İTV kanalı. Milli Qəhrəman
Vüqar Əsgərov. Azərbaycanın Milli Qəhrəmanları (kitab), (Yenidən işlənmiş II nəşr). Bakı: "Dərələyəz-M", 2010, səh. 152–153.

1971 births
1992 deaths
Azerbaijani military personnel
Azerbaijani military personnel of the Nagorno-Karabakh War
Azerbaijani military personnel killed in action
National Heroes of Azerbaijan
People from Sharur District